Fedora is a 1926 German silent film based upon the play by Victorien Sardou, directed by Jean Manoussi and starring Lee Parry, Anita Dorris, and Alfons Fryland.

The film's sets were designed by the art director Artur Günther.

Plot
The story of Russian Princess Fedora (Lee Parry), in Czarist times, whose royal lover is assassinated on the eve of their marriage. She pledges vengeance, only to become the victim of her vow when she falls in love again.

Cast

References

Bibliography

External links

1926 films
Films of the Weimar Republic
Films directed by Jean Manoussi
German silent feature films
German black-and-white films
German films based on plays
Films based on works by Victorien Sardou